The Surrey Senior Cup is the senior Saturday cup competition of the Surrey FA. It is currently competed for by teams playing in the top nine levels of the English football league system who are affiliated to the Surrey FA. The competition was introduced in 1882, at the same time as the Surrey FA voted to affiliate to the Football Association.

Finals
No finals took place from 1914 to 1919 (due to World War I), from 1940 to 1943 (due to World War II), and from 2020 to 2021 (due to the COVID-19 pandemic).

Results by team
Teams who have won the cup more than once

Notes

References

External links
 Official website

Football in Surrey
County Cup competitions
Recurring events established in 1882